is a fictional and playable character in the Soulcalibur series of weapon-based fighting games. Designed by comic book artist and toy designer Todd McFarlane through a collaboration with Namco, the character appeared in console ports of Soulcalibur II and later as part of an action figure set created by McFarlane Productions. Though designed and named by McFarlane, Necrid's concept and physical build were outlined by Namco, who aimed to target North American audiences with the character. Necrid's spoken lines in the game are unintelligible, and no voice actor has been credited.

According to the game's back-story, Necrid was once a human warrior. He sought and found the cursed sword Soul Edge, only to be pulled into the dimension that the sword's spirit inhabits. Escaping the dimension with his body drastically mutated, his memories and sanity initially lost, he now wields various forms of energy as weapons, while searching for fragments of the shattered Soul Edge that soothe the pain caused by his separation from the dimension's energies.

The character has received a divisive response. While some sources criticized the character's design for clashing with the game's aesthetic, some others praised the visual appeal of the character when in motion. Some have called Necrid one of the best characters introduced to the series; others deem him one of the worst.

Conception and creation

Series producer Hiroaki Yotoriyama learned that comics creator Todd McFarlane was a fan of the Soulcalibur series and that McFarlane had praised their characters' designs. Text in each version of the game's box art also drew attention to Necrid. In 2003, McFarlane was interested in creating a new video game based on the Spawn comic book franchise; his search for a developer resulted in a deal with Soulcalibur publisher Namco. When the topic of toys arose in discussions, McFarlane and Namco reached an agreement to release a line of action figures based on Soulcalibur II characters. Afterward, Namco proposed that their company design a new character for video game console ports of the game, an idea that McFarlane accepted because he considered it an opportunity to create a toy based on Necrid's finished design.

Necrid's design targeted North American audiences, specifically fans of American comic books. Although McFarlane received most of the credit for the character, Necrid was the result of a collaboration; Namco outlined the then-unnamed character's traits, such as his in-game role and physical build, and McFarlane's company completed the design. As a result, both companies hold a partial copyright for Necrid, with Namco's rights to the character as a derivative work of McFarlane's illustrations.

Design
Necrid is a bald, green, and muscular humanoid. His eyes glow bright red, and short bones protrude from his left arm, back, jaw and a Mohawk-like ridge on his head. The fingers on his right hand have claw points, but his left hand is much larger and has three fingers with large, talon-like bone claws. Two large, ram-like horns extend from opposite sides of his left wrist, toward and slightly beyond his elbow. His clothing consists of dark blue pants, large metal sandals held together by bandages, and armor plating covering his abdomen, the sides of his legs, and the back of his lower right arm. A pulsating red jewel described by McFarlane as a "power plant" is set in a circular piece of metal strapped to his chest. At about  feet (196 cm), Necrid is the second tallest Soul series character whose height is known.

Necrid's alternate appearance differs heavily, and features scaly, reddish–orange skin. Additional differences include teal eyes, black pants, and a blue jewel. The protruding bones are isolated and bigger on his left shoulder and arm, and appear crystalline. A pauldron covering his right shoulder is fastened to the jewel's support harness, and the armor on his legs incorporate a pair of greaves. He wears a fauld on his abdomen, and bandages wrap around his stomach. A mask covers his face and is held in place by two straps around his head.

Necrid's speech is unintelligible, and the vocal samples in the game's sound test feature are named after emotions, such as "Determination" and "Indignation". He is the only speaking Soulcalibur II character whose voice does not change when the player selects a different language setting.

In video games
As introduced in Soulcalibur II, Necrid is a warrior who fought and defeated a former wielder of the cursed sword Soul Edge, and was pulled into the dimension where the sword's spirit, Inferno, inhabited. Instead of battling Inferno, he fled, and became trapped in the dimension for years. Warped physically and mentally by the dimension as a result, he escaped during the closing events of Soulcalibur, but quickly found that, without the dimension's energies, he experienced intense pain and would eventually die. Attacking travelers he perceived as enemies, he happened upon a fragment of Soul Edge and felt his pain dampened. Pursuing other fragments of the sword, he encountered Talim, who was also seeking them, and helped defeat the resurrected Inferno. His memories and sanity restored by the battle, Necrid closed the entrance to the void, trapping himself within.

To date, Necrid has appeared in only one game of the series, Soulcalibur II. He did not appear in the original arcade version, but was added later when the game was ported to the GameCube, PlayStation 2, and Xbox video game consoles. When asked whether the character would return in Soulcalibur III, Yotoriyama replied, "Necrid has gone on vacation." When the subject came up again during the production of Soulcalibur V, game director Daishi Odashima responded via his Twitter account, “To be honest, that will be too hard to do due to copyright issues.”

Gameplay
Using fighting skills Yotoriyama described as "horrific splendor", Necrid attacks using Maleficus, a transforming, physical manifestation of the energy in Soul Edge. He controls Maleficus by channeling it through his hands to form various bladed weapons, able to set them aside or reabsorb them as needed. Necrid can also attack using other forms of energy, such as ignis fatuus, æther, and chaos, represented in game as equipable alternate weapons with varying effects and attributes. Necrid also incorporates acrobatics into his fighting style through a variety of flips and kicks.

Several of Necrid's attacks duplicate physical motions and properties of attacks used by other characters in the series. However, each attack causes his weapon to extend from then retract into his hands, resulting in different visual cues than the move they derive from. Some attacks combine elements of two other existing character moves; for example, Dragon Blaze begins with one attack used by Maxi and ends with another from Nightmare. Despite this fact some moves are unique to Necrid's repertoire, such as Elder Topaz, an attack stance that allows the use of an altered set of attacks for a short time, and Void Cannon, which creates a small explosion on the ground at varying distances from Necrid.

Promotion and reception
Yotoriyama announced Necrid early in Soulcalibur IIs production for the Xbox, in an interview with the Japanese  magazine Famitsu. Namco later featured the character in promotional items, such as artwork, screenshots, and an animated emoticon, which they distributed to IGN and other news outlets. McFarlane Productions distributed one thousand copies of a limited-edition lithograph to promote the character at E3 2003. Drawn by Greg Capullo, the lithograph featured a comic-book rendition of Necrid, fighting Spawn in one of the game's arenas. In August 2003, Namco included a sculpture of Necrid in a set of five based on different Soulcalibur II characters. McFarlane Productions later gave the sculptures and copies of the game as prizes in a contest named after the character.

Critical response to Necrid varied. University of Delaware professor Rachel Hutchinson cited him as an example of the cultural stereotype of human versus monster, a "mutated or damned [creature] deviant from the human norm" that the game's human characters are expected to vanquish. A staff writer for GameNOW magazine called the visual design "silly" and compared the character to an "old-school He-Man character", but added that Necrid's gameplay was decent. Another magazine, GMR, described him as an example of "bad American comic book design". IGNs Kaiser Hwang called Necrid a "disappointment" and questioned the character's design in comparison to others in the series; he also felt Necrid was "filler" rather than a complete character. GameSpot made similar comments in their review of the game, as did GameSpy. IGNs Xbox article editor described the character's inclusion as an unnecessary marketing ploy and would have preferred new characters made without McFarlane's involvement; the editor also wrote that Necrid did not "vibe" with the rest of the game. 1UP.coms podcast Retronauts criticized the design and wrote that the character's name was used as a synonym for "shitty". They further added that McFarlane had "tainted" the game with Necrid's inclusion, with host Jeremy Parish stating "I could close my eyes and draw a better character". In a retrospective of the series, Joystiq used him as an example of the series succumbing to "commercial gimmicks", citing his design as reviled and that Necrid was either too strong or too weak a character to play as, depending on who one asked.

Other reviewers praised the character's gameplay and design. An editor for the video game website GameZone wrote that his attacks compensated for his appearance and described him as "cool", while also praising both his weapon and fighting style. Adam Sessler and Morgan Webb of X-Play stated that, while Necrid did not seem to fit the aesthetic, the character did have some appeal. UGOs Doug Trueman stated Necrid's weapon had to be "seen to be believed", and described him among other new characters as "[adding] something spectacular to the Soul Calibur pantheon". Tim Rogers of website Insert Credit called Necrid "a work of digital art both in form and function" and added that "as far as console-only characters go—everybody wins with Necrid". Despite their negative remarks, an editor for IGN listed Necrid as eighth on their list of the top ten characters contributed to the Soulcalibur games by designers outside Namco and wrote that while they felt the character's gameplay was unbalanced, it added to Necrid's appeal; the editor wrote "what do you expect from a man who shares a symbiotic relationship with the very energy that powers Soul Edge? If you needed to clean house in [Soulcalibur II], Necrid was the man for the job."

References

Characters created by Todd McFarlane
Fantasy video game characters
Fictional melee weapons practitioners
Fictional monsters
Male characters in video games
Soulcalibur series characters
Video game characters introduced in 2003

ja:ソウルキャリバーの登場人物#ネクリッド